Mark William Shaw (born 23 May 1956) is a former New Zealand rugby union player. A flanker, Shaw represented Horowhenua, Manawatu and Hawke's Bay provincially and the All Blacks internationally. He was educated at Kapiti College.

Shaw was selected for the All Blacks' tour of Australia in 1980, playing in all three tests, and scoring three tries in one of those matches. He toured North America and Wales later that year. Shaw played a total of 68 matches for the All Blacks, 30 of them test matches.

Shaw was appointed as an All Black selector in 2002.

References

1956 births
Living people
New Zealand international rugby union players
New Zealand rugby union players
Hawke's Bay rugby union players
Manawatu rugby union players
Horowhenua-Kapiti rugby union players
Rugby union players from Palmerston North
Rugby union flankers
New Zealand rugby union coaches
People educated at Kapiti College